Lepidochrysops swanepoeli, the Swanepoel's blue, is a species of butterfly in the family Lycaenidae. It is endemic to South Africa, where it is found in montane grassland in the hills above Fairview and the Sheba Mines in Mpumalanga. There is also a single record from northern KwaZulu-Natal.

The wingspan is 36–40 mm for males and 38–42 mm for females. Adults are on wing from September to early December, with a peak in November. There is one extended generation per year.

The larvae feed on Becium grandiflorum.

References

Lepidochrysops
Butterflies described in 1948
Endemic butterflies of South Africa
Taxonomy articles created by Polbot